The Port of Jiaxing is a natural estuary deep-water international seaport on the Hangzhou Bay coast of Jiaxing, Zhejiang, China.

History

Layout

The port of Jiaxing is located on the mouth of the Qiantang River, at the start of Hangzhou Bay. A large number of inland waterways, including the Grand Canal criss-cross Jiaxing prefecture as well. As of 2012 it had 36 berths, 26 capable of handling ships over 10,000 DWT, and 10 berths for 1,000-ton vessels.

Zhapu Port Area, just to the east of the Hangzhou Bay Sea Bridge is the main port area. 
Dushan Port Area
Haiyan Port Area
The Jiaxing Inland Port is located at several areas alongside the many waterways of the region, and is administered independently.

Administration

Operations

References

External links
Port of Jiaxing website

Ports and harbours of China